Mthulisi Maphosa (born 20 March 1983) is a retired Zimbabwean football midfielder. A Zimbabwe international, he played at the 2008 and 2009 COSAFA Cup.

References 

1983 births
Living people
Zimbabwean footballers
Zimbabwe international footballers
Association football midfielders
Zimbabwean expatriate footballers
Expatriate footballers in Botswana
Zimbabwean expatriate sportspeople in Botswana
Expatriate footballers in the Democratic Republic of the Congo
Zimbabwean expatriate sportspeople in the Democratic Republic of the Congo
Sporting Lions F.C. players
Monomotapa United F.C. players
TP Mazembe players
F.C. Platinum players
Highlanders F.C. players
Bulawayo City F.C. players
Bulawayo Chiefs F.C. players